John Walbanke-Childers (27 May 1798 – 8 February 1886) was a British Whig politician.

Family and early life
Walkbanke-Childers was the son of Colonel John Walbanke-Childers (died 1812) and Selena née Gideon (born 1772). He was first educated at Eton College, and then graduated from Christ Church, Oxford, in 1834 with a Master of Arts. In 1824, he married Anne Wood, daughter of Sir Francis Wood, 2nd Baronet, and Anne née Buck; they had at least five children:
 Charlotte Anne Walbanke-Childers
 Leonard John Walbanke-Childers (1826–1837)
 Hugh Walbanke-Childers (1827–1828)
 Rowland Francis Walbanke-Childers (1830–1855)
 Lucy Walbanke-Childers (–1870)

After Anne's death in 1863, he remarried in 1866 to his second cousin, Selena Radford, daughter of Edward Radford and Eliza Diana Walbanke-Childers.

Member of Parliament
Walbanke-Childers was elected a Whig Member of Parliament for Cambridgeshire at the 1832 general election and held the seat until 1835, when he was defeated, ranking last out of four candidates in the poll. He returned to Parliament for Malton at a by-election in 1836—caused by the appointment of Charles Pepys, 1st Earl of Cottenham, as Lord Chancellor, in the process being elevated to the peerage—and held the seat until 1846, when he resigned by accepting the office of Steward of the Chiltern Hundreds. However, the next year, he returned to the same seat at the 1847 general election and held the seat until 1852 when he did not seek re-election.

Other roles
Walbanke-Childers was also High Sheriff of Yorkshire for 1858–1859, a Deputy Lieutenant of Cambridgeshire and West Riding of Yorkshire, and a Justice of the Peace for the latter county.

References

External links
 

1798 births
1886 deaths
Alumni of Christ Church, Oxford
Deputy Lieutenants of Cambridgeshire
Deputy Lieutenants of Yorkshire
English justices of the peace
High Sheriffs of Yorkshire
People educated at Eton College
UK MPs 1832–1835
UK MPs 1835–1837
UK MPs 1837–1841
UK MPs 1841–1847
UK MPs 1847–1852
Whig (British political party) MPs for English constituencies